Saint Vitus is a bar and music venue located in the Greenpoint neighborhood of Brooklyn, New York. Opened in April 2011, the  venue is known for its heavy metal atmosphere. Some notable metal bands that have played there include Pentagram and Black Anvil. In April 2014, the surviving members of Nirvana performed at Saint Vitus with Joan Jett and Kim Gordon. Pitchfork writer Brandon Stosuy has also booked bands at the venue, such as Converge, Iceage, and Deafheaven.

History 
Saint Vitus was opened in April 2011 by Arty Shepherd, Justin Scurti, and George Souleidis, along with silent owners. The space was formerly a plumbing school and before that a social club, and the owners hired Matthew Maddy to design the space, with the intention of only hosting occasional live shows. In April 2016, Saint Vitus celebrated its five-year anniversary with five nights of shows featuring headlining sets from Pallbearer, Corrosion of Conformity, Royal Thunder, and 13th Chime. It has also played host to several regional qualifiers for US Air Guitar.

Saint Vitus hosts weekly metal yoga sessions run by Metal Yoga Bones. In addition, visual artist Karlynn Holland periodically curates day-long art shows under the moniker Dreams Were Made For Mortals.

In 2013, Shepherd and David Castillo, Saint Vitus's talent buyer, started up a record label called Sacrament Recordings and Merchandise to release an album by the band Sannhet.

Notable events 
 November 3, 2011: Black Sabbath's Tony Iommi book signing.
 April 23–28, 2012: One-Year Anniversary Celebration.
 September 25, 2012: Saint Vitus.
 September 25, 2013: Carcass.
 October 11, 2013: JUDGE.
 November 2, 2013: Orange Goblin with Lazer/Wulf and Polygamyst.
 April 10, 2014: Nirvana tribute show with Dave Grohl, Krist Novoselic, Joan Jett, J Mascis, Annie Clark aka St. Vincent, John McCauley of Deer Tick, and Kim Gordon formerly of Sonic Youth.
 July 14, 2014: The Dillinger Escape Plan
 January 25–26, 2015: Zola Jesus, including a performance outside in the snow.
 April 28, 2015: John Lydon aka Johnny Rotten of the Sex Pistols book signing.
 August 3, 2015: The Dillinger Escape Plan
 October 13, 2015:  Fates Warning with Imminent Sonic Destruction
 October 27, 2015: Carrie Brownstein (of Sleater-Kinney) in conversation with Questlove.
 February 22, 2016: Lita Ford book reading.
 August 20, 2016: The Obelisk All-Dayer, a one-day festival hosted by The Obelisk with Mars Red Sky headlining.
 December 12, 2016: Megadeth, billed as Vic and the Rattleheads.
February 9, 2018: Exhorder

References

External links
 Official website

Music venues in Brooklyn
Greenpoint, Brooklyn
Drinking establishments in New York City